JSC Russian Helicopters ( Vertolyoty Rossii) is a helicopter design and manufacturing company headquartered in Moscow, Russia. The company designs and manufactures civilian and military helicopters. The company's principal shareholder is Rostec. It is the world's 24th-largest defence contractor measured by 2012 (its best year in the 21st century) defence revenues, and the second-largest based in Russia (after Almaz-Antey).

History
The company attempted to stage an IPO on the London Stock Exchange in May 2011, but failed to fill the order book at the expected valuation of $2 billion.

In 2011 Russian Helicopters and the Italian company AgustaWestland agreed to establish HeliVert, a joint company, in order to start production in Russia of the AW139 twin-engine multipurpose helicopter. The production plant is located in Tomilino, Moscow Region.

In 2016 the company delivered 189 aircraft to customers in 13 countries. In the same year, it ended a partnership with the Ukraine-based engine maker Motor Sich.

In 2017 the Russian Direct Investment Fund (RDIF) formed a consortium comprising leading Middle Eastern funds and finalized a deal to acquire a minority stake in Russian Helicopters (part of the Rostec State Corporation). Russian Helicopters valuation was estimated at $2.35 billion. No details have been revealed about the identity of the Middle Eastern investors.

The transaction consists of two stages. The first stage involves the sale of a 12% stake and an investment of $300 million, as well as an agreed-upon subsequent potential increase in investment to $600 million. The deal will increase the authorized capital of the holding company. This will accumulate a significant amount of funds within the Company. These funds are necessary for the implementation of the Company’s strategy and business plan, including the development of new types of helicopters. In addition, these funds will help implement the investment program of the holding company, as well as finance possible M&A activities aimed at increasing the holding’s value and finance capital programs.

Products

Russian Helicopters' products include:
Kamov Ka-27
Kamov Ka-31
Kamov Ka-52
Kamov Ka-60/62
Kamov Ka-226
Kazan Ansat
Mil Mi-8
Mil Mi-17
Mil Mi-24
Mil Mi-26
Mil Mi-28
Mil Mi-34
Mil Mi-38
Mil Mi-54
VRT 300
VRT 500

A fifth generation helicopter is currently under development.

Minoga naval helicopter project

In 2006 the Russian defense ministry awarded Russian Helicopters a R&D contract for a naval helicopter conducting antisubmarine warfare among other tasks, following the coaxials Kamov Ka-15, Ka-25, and Ka-27.
The resulting Minoga project has been wind-tunnel tested since, the Russian Navy will inspect a mockup in early 2019 and its maiden flight is planned after 2020.
It may be coaxial and could be based on the early 2000s Ka-92 concept competing with the Mil Mi-X1 for a high-speed civilian helicopter halted in 2015.

Powered by two 380 kg (772 lb) Klimov TV7-117V turboshafts developing 3,500-3,750 hp in emergencies, 2,500-3,000 at maximum takeoff weight, and 1,650 hp in cruise; they are interchangeable with their VK-2500 predecessor, indicating a larger rotorcraft than in 2015, powered by NPO Saturn RD-600V.
It has to be compact enough to store two in a ship hangar housing a single 12 tons Ka-27: Kamov studied a lightweight deck helicopters from four-five to seven-eight metric tons.
The Kamov Ka-52K Katran is in flight tests but is limited to electronic reconnaissance and airstrike.

Structure
The following entities are part of the company:
Designers
 The Mil and Kamov National Center for Helicopters Design
 Mil Moscow Helicopter Plant
 Kamov Design Bureau
 VR-Technologies

Manufacturers
 Ulan-Ude Aviation Plant
 Kazan Helicopters
 Rostvertol
 Progress Arsenyev Aviation Company
 Kumertau Aviation Production Enterprise

Components
 Reductor-PM
 Stupino Machine Production Plant

Joint ventures
 HeliVert

See also
Comparable major helicopter manufacturers:
 AgustaWestland
 Airbus Helicopters
 Bell Helicopter
 Boeing Rotorcraft Systems
 MD Helicopters
 Sikorsky Aircraft

References

External links

Russian Helicopters

 
Aerospace companies of Russia
Holding companies of Russia
Russian brands
Multinational companies headquartered in Russia